Memecylon sisparense is a species of plant in the family Melastomataceae. It is endemic to Sispara in the Nilgiris of Tamil Nadu, India.  It is threatened by habitat loss.

References

Endemic flora of India (region)
sisparense
Critically endangered plants
Taxonomy articles created by Polbot